HMS Dittany was a  of the British Royal Navy during the Second World War.

On 14 August 1942, the name Beacon was approved for PG 88, a modified Flower-class corvette being built at Collingwood, Ontario, Canada. Records indicate that Beacon was to have been accepted under "reverse lend lease", commissioned in Canada, and then taken to the Boston Navy Yard for outfitting. Assigned, first, to the United Kingdom on 30 January 1943, but reassigned to the US Navy on 7 March 1943, she was reassigned again to the Royal Navy on 31 May 1943, and commissioned as HMS Dittany, her original British name. She served under that name for the rest of the war.

External links
 
 NavSource Online: Gunboat Photo Archive - HMS Dittany (K 279) ex-USS Beacon (PG 88) ex-HMS Dittany (K 279)
HMS Dittany (K 279) at uboat.net

World War II naval ships of the United States
Ships built in Collingwood, Ontario
1942 ships
Action-class gunboats
Flower-class corvettes of the Royal Navy